Larson Giovanni Diaz Martinez (born 23 March 1994 in Santa Rosa, Misiones Department, Paraguay) is a Paraguayan javelin thrower. He has a scholarship with the Secretaria Nacional de Deportes and represents Paraguay Marathon Club in the Federación Paraguaya de Atletismo. Díaz claimed a silver medal at the 2013 South American Junior Championships in Athletics.

Larson Giovanni Diaz Martinez and María Caballero were the best athletes of the 2015 Paraguayan Athletics Championships.

He belongs to a line of Paraguayan throwers, such as Ramón Jiménez Gaona (discus), Víctor Fatecha (javelin), Nery Kennedy (javelin) and Edgar Baumann (javelin), who all had successful careers.

Career
At the age of 16 years old, Díaz begins athletics for Athletics School of Misiones and begins to take the sport seriously when he realizes that he can make the correct result to qualify for the South American Championships in Javelin Throw, and receives support from the FPA and the SND. Despite having pain in the leg, he did not give up.

2013
In 2013, Díaz claimed a silver medal at the 2013 South American Junior Championships in Athletics, throwing a distance of  62.25 m.

2014
In 2014, Díaz was one of three Paraguayan throwers to reach over 70 metres, including Víctor Fatecha and Fabian Jara.

2015
At the 2015 National Senior Championships , he finished 2nd with 72.40m in Javelin and achieved the result for the Pan American Games in Canada.

Díaz represented Paraguay at the 2015 South American Championships in Athletics disputed in Lima in June 2015. Díaz finished in fifth position having thrown 70.52 metres, surpassing compatriot and 2008 Summer Olympics Paraguay representative Victor Fatecha.

On 25 September 2015, Díaz was crowned champion of the Federación Paraguaya de Atletismo National Men's Javelin competition disputed at the Secretaria Nacional de Deportes. Díaz surpassed Victor Fatecha by throwing 75.57 metres.

The mark of 75.57 metres was registered by IAAF as the athlete's personal best.

Díaz concluded the 2015 IAAF season being ranked 140th in the world.

2016
In 2016, he states that his objective is to be one of the best Paraguayan athletes.

2018
Díaz achieves qualification to the 2018 Juegos Odesur by throwing 69.53m in April.

Personal bests
Javelin throw: 75.57m –  Secretaria Nacional de Deportes, Asunción, 25 September 2015

Seasonal bests
IAAF Profile and Federación Paraguaya de Atletismo
2013 - 62.25m
2014 - 70.50m
2015 - 75.57m
2016 - 74.04m 
2017 - 72.99m
2018 - 69.53m

Personal life
Since the scholarship, he lives at the residence of the Paraguayan Olympic Committee ubicated in the city of Luque.

References

External links
 

1994 births
Living people
Paraguayan male javelin throwers
People from Misiones Department
21st-century Paraguayan people